The Gray was an automobile manufactured in Detroit, Michigan by the Gray Motor Corporation from 1922 to 1926.  The Gray Motor Corporation produced two models, the Star and Gray.  They were an attempt to win a share of the mass market dominated by Ford Model T.  Many of the employees of Gray, were former Ford employees, including the head of Gray Corporation, Frank L. Klingensmith, who was the former vice president and treasurer of Ford Motor Company.  The vehicles had similar features of engine and chassis to the Model T.  The engine had a side-valve, four-cylinder 2.7 litre configuration.  The suspension used a conventional quarter-elliptical spring at the front and rear.  Front-wheeled brakes were offered in 1926, the last year of production.  They planned on production of nearly a quarter of a million a year the first year, but those volumes were never realized.  The touring car cost $490, and the coach was sold at $760, the first year of production.

References
 

Defunct motor vehicle manufacturers of the United States
Motor vehicle manufacturers based in Michigan
Defunct manufacturing companies based in Michigan